Finland–Norway relations are the foreign relations between Finland and Norway. The states share the Finland-Norway border.

Both countries established diplomatic relations in 1917, after Finland's independence. Finland has an embassy in Oslo. Norway has an embassy in Helsinki.

For some decades surrounding 1900, many in Norway feared the Finnish immigration and Kven people in Northern Norway, coining the term "the Finnish danger". For a period, interests in Norway wanted to annex parts of Lapland (most notably the "arm" protruding from the north-west and into Storfjord) as buffer zones. The controversy around Finns in Norway subsided over time, and the land claim never evolved into open conflict.

Both countries are full members of the Nordic Union, Council of the Baltic Sea States, and of the Council of Europe. There are around 2,000 Norwegians living in Finland and around 6,665 Finns (15-60,000 including Kvens) living in Norway.

Country comparison

European Union
Finland joined the EU in 1995. Norway has never been a member of EU.

NATO 
Norway was a founding full member of NATO. Finland has stayed out of NATO until they applied to join alongside Sweden in 2022.

Resident diplomatic missions
 Finland has an embassy in Oslo. 
 Norway has an embassy in Helsinki.

See also 
 Foreign relations of Finland
 Foreign relations of Norway
 Norway–EU relations
 Finland–Norway border

References 

 

 
Norway
Bilateral relations of Norway